The 2019–20 Championnat National 2 was the 22nd season of the fourth tier in the French football league system in its current format. The competition was contested by 64 clubs split geographically across 4 groups of 16 teams each. The teams included amateur clubs (although a few are semi-professional) and the reserve teams of professional clubs. The season was suspended indefinitely on 12 March 2020 due to the COVID-19 pandemic.

On 16 April 2020, the FFF announced the termination of the competition, with promotion and relegation decided by points earned per game played, subject to the normal verification process by the financial authority, the DNCG.

Teams
On 16 July, the FFF ratified the constitution of the competition, and published the groups as follows:

 46 clubs who were neither relegated or promoted from the 2018–19 Championnat National 2 groups.
 3 teams relegated from 2018–19 Championnat National (Drancy, L'Entente SSG, Marignane Gignac). 
 12 teams promoted from 2018–19 Championnat National 3. (Angoulême, Angers (res), Bourges Foot, SC Bastia, Louhans-Cuiseaux, Mulhouse, Montpellier (res), Saint-Quentin, Rouen, Guingamp (res), Gobelins and Chamalières).
 3 teams reprieved from relegation from the 2018–19 Championnat National 2 groups (Haguenau, Nîmes(res), Monaco (res)).

League tables

Group A

Group B

Group C

Group D

Top scorers

Season outcomes

Promotion
SC Bastia, Saint-Brieuc, Sète and Annecy were champions of each group, and are promoted to 2020–21 Championnat National, subject to the usual ratification by the FFF and DNCG.

Relegation
Croix, Drancy, Lille (res), Mantes, Oissel, Vitré, Montpellier (res), Stade Bordelais, Saint-Étienne (res), Saint-Priest, Endoume Marseille and Nîmes (res) finished in the relegation places, and are relegated to 2020–21 Championnat National 3, subject to any reprieves detailed in the next section.

On 16 June 2020 Mulhouse were administrative relegated by the DNCG committee of the FFF. The relegation was confirmed on appeal.

Reprieves
Any reprieves required due to administrative relegations, mergers or clubs folding are usually decided by taking, in order, the 14th placed clubs ranked by order of their record against clubs finishing 9th to 13th position in their group, followed by the 15th placed clubs ranked by order of their record against clubs finishing in 10th to 14th position in their group. Due to the season not being completed, this ranking used points per game rather than points earned.

Saint-Priest were reprieved due to the administrative relegation of Mulhouse, subject to that club appealing the decision.

Best 14th placed team

Best 15th placed team

References

2019-20
4
Fra
France